Miss Teen USA 2023 will be the 41st Miss Teen USA pageant that will be held in 2023 at the Grand Sierra Resort in Reno, Nevada. Faron Medhi of Nebraska will crown her successor at the end of the event.

Background

Location

On July 14, 2022, it was reported that the competition would be held in Reno, Nevada, with the city securing a three-year deal to host the pageant from 2022 to 2024. This will be the third time that the pageant is held in Reno, and a second consecutive year holding the pageant in the city, following Miss USA 2019 and 2022. Miss USA organization president Crystle Stewart said the location was chosen to honor Cheslie Kryst, who had been crowned Miss USA 2019 in the same venue and had died of suicide in January 2022.

On October 7, the Miss USA and its sister pageant, Miss Teen USA, were suspended and handed over their management to the Miss Universe Organization, due to allegations that the previous competition was rigged resulting Stewart suspended.

Selection of contestants

Delegates from the 50 states and the District of Columbia are selected in state pageants which began in September 2022 and scheduled to conclude in August 2023, as the state pageant schedule can become very dense between the last state pageant held from 2022. The first state pageant was Idaho, held on September 11, 2022.

Contestants

Upcoming state pageants

Notes

References

External links

 

2023
2023 in the United States
2023 beauty pageants
Beauty pageants in the United States